Concussions in England's professional rugby union are the most common injury received. Concussion can occur where an individual experiences an impact to the head, and commonly occurs in high-contact sporting activities, including American football, boxing, MMA and the rugby codes. It can also occur in recreational activities like horse riding, jumping, cycling, and skiing. The reason is that it doesn't have to be something to strike you in the proximity of the brain, but can also be caused by rapid change of movement, giving the skull not enough time to move with the body, causing the brain to press against the skull. With rugby being such a contact and fast moving sport, it is no wonder why there is concussion and other head injuries occurring. With the development of equipment and training methods, these will help benefit the players on the field know what could happen and how they can help with preventing it.

History of concussions 
A concussion, which is known as a subset of traumatic brain injury (TBI), is when a force comes in contact with the head, neck or face, or fast movement of the head, causing a functional injury to the brain. The severity of any injury depends on the location & strength of the impact. It is short-lived impairment of neurological function, the brains ability to process information, which can be resolved in seven to ten days. Not all concussion involves the loss of consciousness, with it occurring in less than 10% of concussions. Second-impact syndrome is when a player has obtained a second concussion when you either return to field the same day, or return to play before a complete recovery from a previous concussion. This is a result from brain swelling, from vascular congestion and increased intracranial pressure, this can be fatal to a player as it is a very difficult medical injury to control. The brain is surrounded by cerebrospinal fluid, which protects it from light trauma. More severe impacts, or the forces associated with rapid acceleration, may not be absorbed by this cushion. Concussion may be caused by impact forces, in which the head strikes or is struck by something, or impulsive forces, in which the head moves without itself being subject to blunt trauma (for example, when the chest hits something and the head snaps forward). Chronic traumatic encephalopathy, or "CTE", is an example of the cumulative damage that can occur as the result of multiple concussions or less severe blows to the head. The condition was previously referred to as "dementia pugilistica", or "punch drunk" syndrome, as it was first noted in boxers. The disease can lead to cognitive and physical handicaps such as parkinsonism, speech and memory problems, slowed mental processing, tremor, depression, and inappropriate behavior. It shares features with Alzheimer's disease.

In a 2013 interview, recently retired Scotland international Rory Lamont was critical of the then-current protocols for handling concussions, notably the Pitchside Suspected Concussion Assessment (PSCA) employed at that time::

Connection with rugby union 

Rugby union has been played since the early 19th century. Being a high contact sport it has the highest announced rates of concussions and outside England also has the highest number of catastrophic injuries out of any team sport. Research finding that during match play, concussion was reported at a higher level, and during training at a lower level, but still at a higher level than most players of another sport to receive. With the game being both physically and mentally demanding, it varies from being at high intensities of sprinting, tackling and rucking, with small intensities of jogging and walking. The position of the forwards consists of them having to have a lot of physical strength to get the ball from the other team, or create gaps for their team to run through. Where as the backs are the players that make the play happen, making runs with the ball, with the protection of the forwards stopping attacks, the backs still do get tackled like any other player on the field, so they have to have physical strength as much as a forward. The Concussion bin was replaced by the head bin in 2012 with the players assessment taking 10 minutes.

About a quarter of rugby players are injured in each season.

In the US, college rugby has much higher injury rates than college football. Rugby union has similar injury types to American football but with more common injuries of arms.

Causes and likelihood of concussion 
Concussion was the most commonly reported Premiership Rugby match injury in 2015-16 (for the 5th consecutive season), constituting appropriately 25% of all match injuries, and the RFU medical officer said that the tackle is where the overwhelming majority of concussions occur.
A study found that playing more than 25 matches in the 2015/2016 season meant that sustaining concussion was more likely than not sustaining concussion.

Signs of concussion 
Some of the effects that concussion can cause to an individual's mind set can vary, depending on the circumstances and the severity of the impact. The common signs of concussion can be; blank look, slow to get up off of the ground, unsteady on their feet, grabbing their head, confused in where they are or what they are doing, and obviously if they are unconscious. These are the things that a spectator, coach and medical assistant will notice in a player. Sometimes concussion can go unrecognised, so from a players point there can be these symptoms; continual headaches, dizziness, visual problems, feeling of fatigue and drowsiness. These all can occur post game, so a player needs to have knowledge of what these signs could mean.

Saliva testing 
Although not commonly used at present, novel experimental methods to rapidly diagnose concussion in the field have been developed by research laboratories in the US and UK, based on the detection of RNA biomarkers in saliva.

Treatment of the injury 

Once taken off the field of play due to possible concussion, being unconscious, or showing the symptoms post game, getting medical advice as soon as possible is recommended. At the hospital or medical practice, the player will be under observation, if they are experiencing a headache, mild pain killers will be given. The medical professional will request that no food or drink is to be consumed until advised. They will then assess whether the player needs an x-ray, to check for any possible cervical vertebrae damage, or a computerised axial tomography (CT Scan) to check for any brain or cranium damage. With a mild head injury being sent home to take care and doing activities slower than usual, and maintaining painkillers. If symptoms of concussion do not disappear in the average of seven to ten days, then seek medical advice again as injury could be worse. In post-concussion syndrome, symptoms do not resolve for weeks, months, or years after a concussion, and may occasionally be permanent. About 10% to 20% of people have post concussion syndrome for more than a month.

Controlling concussions 
In order to minimise the risk of concussion and repetitive head trauma, the method of the 6 R's is used. Firstly Recognising and Removing a suspected player of concussion, to stop the injury from getting worse. Secondly Refer, whether the player is either recognised or suspected with concussion they must see a medical doctor as soon as possible. 90.8% of players knew they should not continue playing when concussed. 75% of players would continue an important game even if concussed. Of those concussed, 39.1% have tried to influence medical assessment with 78.2% stating it is possible or quite easy to do so. If the player is diagnosed with concussion, they then must Rest, until all signs of concussion are gone. The player must then Recover by just returning to general activities in life, then progressing back to playing. Returning to play, must follow the Graduated Return to Play (GRTP) protocol, by having clearance from a medical professional, and no symptoms of concussion. Despite good knowledge of concussion complications, management players engage in unsafe behaviour with little difference between gender and competition grades. Information regarding symptoms and management should be available to all players, coaches, and parents. On-going education is needed to assist coaches in identifying concussion signs and symptoms.  Provision of medical care should be mandatory at every level of competition.

Effect of concussions on brain functioning in later life 
A 2017 study found that past participation in rugby or a history of concussion were associated with small to moderate neurocognitive deficits after retirement from competitive sport.

See also 
 Share your views on sports-related s on Wikiversity
 Head injury 
 Rugby union
 Concussions in sport
 Concussions in Australian sport

References 

Rugby union controversies
Sports injuries
Concussions